The 1905 Syracuse Orangemen football team represented Syracuse University during the 1905 college football season. The head coach was Charles P. Hutchins, coaching his second season with the Orangemen.

Schedule

References

Syracuse
Syracuse Orange football seasons
Syracuse Orangemen football